47 to 84 is an Indian Punjabi film based on a realistic story that has been shot in Punjab, Chandigarh, New Delhi and the nearby areas. This movie is about the journey of a child through the traumatic times of the India-Pakistan partition, and when her life was finally heading to  normality, the 84 riots happened. The film is directed by Rajiv Sharma & produced by Babli Singh. The film was released on 30 May 2014.

Awards

PTC Punjabi Film Awards 2015

Pending
PTC Punjabi Film Award for Best Lyricist - Munna Dhiman for Raat
PTC Punjabi Film Award for Best Playback Singer (Female) - Ashpreet Jugni for Hun Main Kisnu Watan Kahunga
PTC Punjabi Film Award for Best Playback Singer (Male) - Krishna for Raat
PTC Punjabi Film Award for Best Performance in a Negative Role - Ashish Duggal 
PTC Punjabi Film Award for Best Supporting Actress - Natasha Rana 
PTC Punjabi Film Award for Best Debut Male - Zafar Dhillon

References

2014 films
India–Pakistan relations in popular culture
Films set in the partition of India
Films about massacres of Sikhs
Films based on 1984 anti-Sikh riots
Insurgency in Punjab in fiction
Punjabi-language Indian films
2010s Punjabi-language films
Fictional portrayals of the Delhi Police
Fictional portrayals of the Punjab Police (India)